WNTU-LD and WNPX-LD are low-powered Daystar-owned-and-operated television stations licensed to Nashville, Tennessee, United States. The stations are owned by the Daystar Television Network.

History

WNTU-LD
The Station was built and signed on by the Evansville, Indiana-based company South Central Communications, and signed on briefly under the call sign W68CG and broadcast on channel 68 before changing its call sign to W26BW in 1999 and moving to channel 26 to get better coverage at a better frequency. The station signed on as an affiliate of The Box, showing music videos 24 hours a day. The station would change its call sign again a year later on April 16, 1999, to WGAP-LP. A month later in May 1999, The Box was acquired by MTV Networks. (A division of Viacom) The Box ceased operations just over 2 and a half years later on January 1, 2001 and was replaced by MTV2, which featured a mix of set rotation and viewer request music video blocks at the time on its affiliates including WGAP-LP.

On June 11, 2006, South Central Communications announced that they would sell WGAP to Little Rock, Arkansas-based Equity Broadcasting. Equity also announced that when they purchased the station, they would make it a Univision affiliate. It would also be the third Spanish language station in Nashville (behind then Telemundo Affiliate, which was seen at the time on WSMV-TV's second digital sub-channel of 4.2 and WLLC-LP, channel 42 (which was first Telefutura, as that Network rebranded to UniMás, WLLC would regain the Univision affiliation on its main channel and move the UniMás affiliation to its second sub-channel.))  The sale was finalized on November 13, 2006, as the station changed to the New Univision affiliation the next day. A year later, the callsign was also changed to the current calls of WNTU-LP on March 20, 2007.

Due to the 2008 bankruptcy of Equity Broadcasting, WNTU was sold at auction to the Daystar Television Network on April 16, 2009, and the sale closed on July 30, 2009. Immediately after on July 31, the station switched to carrying all Daystar Programming 24 hours a day. This left Nashville without a Univision Affiliate (Univision was still seen on cable and satellite providers in the Nashville area) and with two Spanish-language outlets (Telemundo affiliate on WSMV-TV's second digital sub-channel of 4.2 and Telefutura (Now UniMás) affiliate WLLC-LP. However, WSMV-TV discontinued the Telemundo affiliation on December 31, 2010, as that would leave only WLLC-LP as the only Spanish language outlet in Nashville.) Univision made its return to the Nashville Airwaves, as WLLC-LP retained the Univision affiliation on its main sub-channel of 42.1 and moved UniMás to 42.2 and Bounce TV to 42.3.

WNTU's digital signal began broadcasting on digital UHF channel 47 in 2011. The station's digital counterpart (WNTU-LD) is operated on a construction permit in preparation of the digital television transition for low-powered television stations that have not shut down their analog signals. Low-power stations who still broadcast in analog, including WNTU-LP, were obligated to shut down their analog signal and replace it with a digital signal by September 1, 2015. However, the cutoff date for standard LPTVs and translators still broadcasting in analog had been suspended until further notice, therefore, WNTU continued to broadcast in analog until the shutoff of analog television stations, which occurred on July 13, 2021. As a result of the FCC Spectrum Auction, WNTU-LP has applied for a Construction Permit to relocate Digital Operations from Channel 47 to Channel 26 by Flash Cut. WNTU returned to the air, retaining its Daystar programming on January 6, 2022, and the station's callsign was changed to WNTU-LD on February 7, 2022.

WNTU-LD once again went off the air temporarily on May 11, 2022, to make adjustments to their transmitter site and antenna adjustments, the station will return to the air, once the adjustments are compleated. However, before the station signed off, it was in a channel sharing agreement with WRTN-LD, as that station was preparing to move to their new digital channel of 17.

WNPX-LD
WNPX-LP was built and signed on in 1989 by Family Broadcasting Company as a religious independent station, under the callsign W10BI. A few months later, the station was purchased by TV 10, Inc., and slowly converted to a general independent station. In 1992, the station was sold to James W. Owens, who would then sell the station to Tiger Eye Broadcasting in 1997. The station changed its callsign to WVIE-LP in 1999. In 2000, Paxson Communications purchased WVIE from Tiger Eye Broadcasting, and the station began broadcasting programming from Pax TV (now Ion Television) and became a sister station to the full-powered WNPX-TV. The callsign was changed to the current WNPX-LP in 2003. On December 15, 2014, Ion reached a deal to donate WNPX-LP to Word of God Fellowship, parent company of the Daystar network (which are also the owners of WNTU-LP). Shortly after the sale, WNPX-LP was taken silent and went off the air while converting to digital operations. The sale of the station was finalized by the FCC on March 26, 2015, and made WNPX-LP a sister station to WNTU-LP. The conversion to digital was finalized on January 20, 2022, and the station returned to the air on January 31, 2022, as a Daystar affiliate, and under the new callsign of WNPX-LD.

On August 1, 2022, WNPX-LD increased their power to 12 kw, and also added two subchannels, Daystar Español on 24.2 and an SD Feed of Daystar on 24.3.

Other broadcasting information

From 2009 to 2020, Daystar's programming was also seen on neighboring low-powered station WRTN-LD, which serves the Alexandria and Lebanon, Tennessee areas, and also serves the Nashville area. WRTN went off the air on July 3, 2020, to upgrade their transmitter and to relocate to their new digital channel of channel 17, as a result of the FCC Spectrum Auction. It was unknown if Daystar's programming would be returning and continue to be seen on WRTN's main channel when WNTU-LP and WNPX-LP upgraded to digital, However on Monday April 25, 2022, WRTN-LD returned to the air, and is currently in a channel sharing agreement with WNTU-LD (On UHF channel 26) and is also carrying and sharing the Daystar affiliation on its main subchannel of 6.1, until WRTN moves to its new digital channel location of channel 17.

From November 15, 2018, to January 1, 2019, Daystar's programming would also be seen on WJNK-LD, on its digital subchannel of 34.4. This was a move to extend Daystar's coverage in the Nashville, Tennessee and surrounding areas. Daystar's programming was dropped by WJNK after January 1.

Analog to digital conversion

Digital channels

WNTU had a construction permit to upgrade to digital on Channel 17, however, that application was dismissed, as a result of WRTN-LP (which was on Digital Channel 7) moving to Digital Channel 17, as a result of PBS Member Station, WNPT-TV moving to Digital Channel 7. The station had another construction permit application to upgrade to digital on Channel 47, however as a result of the FCC Spectrum Auction, all Television Stations including Low Powered Stations must relocate their Channel Frequencies to broadcasting below channel 37 by July 13, 2020, or Shut down & cease operations of those Stations. Therefore, WNTU-LP applied for another Construction Permit to Flash Cut its digital operations to Channel 26 on March 24, 2018. WNPX-LP also had a construction permit to flash cut to digital on channel 20 but, due to the FCC Spectrum Auction & Repacking, WZTV applied to move it's existing digital signal to from channel 15 to channel 20. As a result, the digital signal for WNPX-LP will be located on channel 24 once implemented. Both stations had to upgrade to digital operations by September 1, 2015, However, as a result of the FCC Spectrum Auction, The Deadline was then pushed up to July 13, 2021. WNTU-LP's analog signal permanently went off the air at the stroke of midnight on July 13, 2021. Both WNTU-LD & WNPX-LD were supposed to come on the air with their digital signals in late May or June 2021, before their permit's expiration date of July 13, 2021 (the end of low power analog stations in the US), but because of shipping delays of the equipment and also as a result of the COVID-19 pandemic (Which caused the shipping delays of the equipment), both stations asked for an extension until September 1, 2021. The digital conversion was finalized for both stations, as they returned to the air in January 2022. (WNTU-LD returned January 6 and WNPX-LD followed on January 31.)

References

External links
 
 

NTU-LP
Daystar (TV network) affiliates
Low-power television stations in the United States